Cristoforo Colombo (1451–1506) was an Italian explorer better known as "Christopher Columbus".

Cristoforo Colombo may also refer to:

Cristoforo Colombo (opera), an 1892 opera in four acts and an epilogue by Italian Alberto Franchetti
SS Cristoforo Colombo, an Italian ocean liner built in the 1950s
Italian corvette Cristoforo Colombo (1892), an Italian unprotected corvette
Italian school ship Cristoforo Colombo (1926), an Italian tall ship, later Dunay in the Soviet Navy
Via Cristoforo Colombo, a road in Rome named for Christopher Columbus died in 1305
Genoa Cristoforo Colombo Airport, airport of Genoa, Italy

See also
 Christopher Columbus (disambiguation)
 Cristoforo (given name)